The 33rd edition of the World Allround Speed Skating Championships took place on 4 and 5 March in Heerenveen at the Thialf ice rink.

Title holder was the Netherlander Atje Keulen-Deelstra.

Distance medalists

Classification

Source:

 * = Fell

Attribution
In Dutch

References

1970s in speed skating
1970s in women's speed skating
1972 World Allround